Oscar Lindberg (born 29 October 1991) is a Swedish professional ice hockey forward who is currently playing with SC Bern of the National League (NL). He previously played for the New York Rangers, the Vegas Golden Knights and the Ottawa Senators in the National Hockey League (NHL). He represented Sweden in the 2011 World Junior Ice Hockey Championships. He also represented Sweden on their gold medal-winning 2013 IIHF World Championship team.

Playing career

Phoenix Coyotes
Central Scouting Bureau ranked Lindberg seventh among European Skaters for the 2010 NHL Entry Draft, however he was not was drafted until the second round, 57th overall, by the Phoenix Coyotes.

New York Rangers

On 8 May 2011, Lindberg was traded from the Phoenix Coyotes to the New York Rangers in return for Ethan Werek.

In 2012–13, Lindberg was awarded the Stefan Liv Memorial Trophy as the Most Valuable Player of the SEL playoffs.

On 24 February 2015, Lindberg played in one New York Rangers game, with forward Rick Nash out with a fever. The New York Rangers won the game 1–0.

Lindberg was named the Rangers' best rookie in their 2015 training camp. He made the Rangers out of training camp for the 2015–16 season and scored his first NHL goal in the first period on opening night against Corey Crawford of the Chicago Blackhawks.

Vegas Golden Knights
On 21 June 2017, Lindberg went unprotected by the Rangers in the 2017 NHL Expansion Draft and was subsequently selected by the Vegas Golden Knights. As a restricted free agent he later agreed on a two-year contract worth $3.4 million with the Golden Knights on 4 July 2017.

On 10 October 2017, Lindberg scored his first goal with the Golden Knights in the Knights first franchise home game.

Ottawa Senators
On 25 February 2019, Lindberg, Erik Brännström and a second-round draft pick in the 2020 NHL Entry Draft, were traded to the Ottawa Senators in return for Mark Stone and Tobias Lindberg (no relation).

EV Zug
On 26 August 2019, as an NHL free agent, Lindberg joined EV Zug of the National League (NL) on a one-year deal with an option for a second season. In the 2019–20 season, Lindberg was placed in an increased role with Zug, registering 14 goals and 30 points through 46 games, before the season was cancelled due to COVID-19.

Dynamo Moscow
Having left his optional contract with Zug, Lindberg moved to the KHL as a free agent, securing a one-year deal with HC Dynamo Moscow on 8 May 2020. In the 2021–22 season, Lindberg was limited to just 24 regular season games, however increased his offensive output with a point-per-game pace of 25 points.

SC Bern
As a free agent at the conclusion of his deal with Dynamo, Lindberg opted to return to the Swiss National League, agreeing to a two-year deal with SC Bern on 10 June 2022.

Career statistics

Regular season and playoffs

International

References

External links
 

1991 births
Living people
Arizona Coyotes draft picks
SC Bern players
HC Dynamo Moscow players
Hartford Wolf Pack players
New York Rangers players
Ottawa Senators players
Skellefteå AIK players
Swedish ice hockey centres
People from Skellefteå Municipality
Stefan Liv Memorial Trophy winners
Vegas Golden Knights players
EV Zug players
Sportspeople from Västerbotten County